Royal Order of the Star of Oceania is a Hawaiian order founded on 16 December 1886 by king Kalākaua as a symbol of gratitude for work done for the good of a hypothetical Oceanic confederation.

The order has seven grades.

Recipients 
 Malietoa Laupepa, King (Tafaifa) of Samoa.- Knight Grand Cross (7 January 1887).

References 

Orders, decorations, and medals of Hawaii
Hawaii (island)
1886 awards